Tajikistan competed at the 2020 Summer Olympics in Tokyo. Originally scheduled to take place from 24 July to 9 August 2020, the Games were postponed to 23 July to 8 August 2021, because of the COVID-19 pandemic. It was the nation's seventh consecutive appearance at the Summer Olympics in the post-Soviet era.

Competitors
The following is the list of number of competitors in the Games.

Athletics

One Tajik athlete further achieved the entry standards by qualifying time, in the following track and field events (up to a maximum of 3 athletes in each event):

Track & road events

Boxing

Tajikistan entered two male boxers into the Olympic tournament. Reigning Asian amateur champion Bakhodur Usmonov (men's lightweight) and Shabbos Negmatulloev (men's light heavyweight) secured the spots on the Tajik squad, by scoring a box-off triumph each in their respective weight divisions at the 2020 Asia & Oceania Qualification Tournament in Amman, Jordan.

Judo
 
Tajikistan entered four judoka into the Olympic tournament based on the International Judo Federation Olympics Individual Ranking.

Swimming

Tajikistan received a universality invitation from FINA to send two top-ranked swimmers (one per gender) in their respective individual events to the Olympics, based on the FINA Points System of June 28, 2021.

References

Nations at the 2020 Summer Olympics
2020
2021 in Tajikistani sport